Arnold Frank Hills (12 March 1857 – 7 March 1927) was an English businessman, sportsman, philanthropist, and promoter of vegetarianism.

Biography

Hills was born in Denmark Hill, Surrey, son of a manufacturing chemist.

Arnold Hills was also a keen sportsman who was the English mile (1878) and three-mile champion (1879), and in his youth had played football and cricket (he was Captain of the 1st XI) for his school team Harrow. After leaving Harrow he attended University College, Oxford, where he earned the degree of B.A. (1880) and two football blues. He appeared as a forward for Oxford University as they finished runners-up in the 1877 FA Cup Final against Wanderers.

He continued to play as an amateur for Old Harrovians after he left, even winning a Corinthian's Cap whilst there; for England, against Scotland on 5 April 1879 at the Kennington Oval, when England won 5–4.

In addition to his vegetarian activism, Hills was Managing Director of the Thames Iron Works, a large shipbuilding business in London which had existed since 1846. He chose to live for five years among his workers in a small house in the East India Dock Road in Canning Town and organised recreational centres for them.

However, he caused some bitterness when there was a strike over poor pay and working conditions by employing 'black' labour. Considering his philanthropy, it must have been a situation that troubled him greatly.

In the summer of 1895 Hills, along with Dave Taylor, helped found Thames Ironworks F.C., who later became West Ham United. He believed that his own local community should have its own football team and financially supported the football club until April 1900, when after increasing disagreements with West Ham's board members over the pursuit of 'professionalism', he broke formal ties with the club and the Thames Ironworks.

Hills proposed a West Ham as a limited company and became the major shareholder, and encouraged business associates, family and his workmen to invest, promising to buy one share for every one sold to the public. He rented the Memorial Grounds to the club at very favourable terms. Hills told the new directors he would not interfere in the running of the club and was true to his word and despite being by far the largest single shareholder never attended an AGM, ask to address a meeting or present any demands or suggestions.

The failing fortunes of the ironworks and his involvement in developing a new car engine pushed the club into the background and he became a virtual invalid suffering from arthritis. He died at Hammerfield, Penshurst, Kent, in 1927 aged 69, and was buried at St Luke's Church in Penshurst. His shareholding in West Ham of 1100 out of 4000 (1142 shares remained unsold until 1961) passed to his family and the same arrangements remained.

In 2014 as part of their preparation for their move to the Olympic Stadium, West Ham announced one of the corporate entertainment areas would be a private dining club, the Arnold Hills suite.

Vegetarianism

Hills was the first President of the London Vegetarian Society (1888) serving alongside the young Mahatma Gandhi on the Executive Committee. He was also the first President of the Vegetarian Cycling and Athletic Club and also served as President of a London Vegetarian Rambling Club. He founded The Vegetarian, an independent magazine, as well as the Vegetarian Federal Union (1889), of which he was also President. Hills also had close ties with the Temperance League. He founded the Oriolet Fruitarian Hospital at Loughton, under the medical direction of Josiah Oldfield.

Hills authored Vital Food (1892) which argued for a plant-based raw food diet.

Charles W. Forward's 1898 book on vegetarian history, Fifty Years of Food Reform was dedicated to Hills.

Publications

Vital Food (1892)
Vegetarian Essays (1897)
Essays on Vegetarianism (1910)

References

Further reading

External links
 Arnold Hills — information from the International Vegetarian Union
 Arnold Hills — biography on the Oxford University Association Football Club website
 Port of London History — information about the Thames Ironworks company

1857 births
1927 deaths
Alumni of University College, Oxford
Association football forwards
British vegetarianism activists
England international footballers
English businesspeople
English footballers
English philanthropists
English temperance activists
FA Cup Final players
Footballers from the London Borough of Lambeth
Old Harrovians F.C. players
Oxford University A.F.C. players
People associated with the Vegetarian Society
People educated at Harrow School
Raw foodists
Wanderers F.C. players